Igor Warabida (born 13 January 1975) is a Polish modern pentathlete. He represented Poland at the 1996 Summer Olympics held in Atlanta, United States in the modern pentathlon event. He finished in 5th place.

He also represented Poland at the 2000 Summer Olympics held in Sydney, Australia in the men's modern pentathlon and he finished in 15th place.

References

External links 
 
 

1975 births
Living people
Sportspeople from Warsaw
Polish male modern pentathletes
Olympic modern pentathletes of Poland
Modern pentathletes at the 1996 Summer Olympics
Modern pentathletes at the 2000 Summer Olympics